USS Brownsville (PG-118/PF-10), a  patrol frigate, was the only ship of the United States Navy to be named for Brownsville, Texas.

Construction and commissioning
Brownsville, originally classified as patrol gunboat, PG-118, was reclassified as a patrol frigate, PF-10, on 15 April 1943. She was laid down on 14 September 1943, under a Maritime Commission (MARCOM) contract, MC hull 1428, at the Permanente Metals Richmond Shipyard #4, Richmond, California. Brownsville was launched on 14 November 1943, sponsored by Mrs. Lillian Runyon Burney; and commissioned on 6 May 1944.

Service history

United States Navy
Brownsville completed outfitting at Richmond, between 6 May and 19 June. At the end of this, on 19 June, the patrol frigate headed south to San Diego, where she engaged in a month of shakedown training. On 21 July, she completed that training and began post-shakedown availability at Alameda and Oakland, California. After several extensions, she completed her repair period near the end of September, and reported for duty at San Diego, on 28 September.

Brownsville spent her entire, brief Navy career assigned to the Commander, Western Sea Frontier. From September 1944 to April 1945, she served in the Southern California Sector, operating out of San Diego. She conducted barrier patrols and escorted coastal shipping in addition to amphibious training and anti-submarine warfare exercises.  After April 1945, the patrol frigate moved to the Northern California Sector and, after a brief assignment patrolling off the entrance to San Francisco Bay, began weather patrols and planeguard duty out of San Francisco. That duty, punctuated by repair periods at Treasure Island, lasted until 15 April 1946, when she was decommissioned, turned over to the Coast Guard on a loan basis, and commissioned as USCGC Brownsville.

United States Coast Guard
The Coast Guard made use of her only until the following August. On 2 August 1946, she was decommissioned once more and later returned to the Navy. Declared surplus to the needs of the Navy, Brownsville was berthed at Seattle, Washington, for more than a year. Her name was struck from the Navy List on 25 September 1946, and she was sold to the Franklin Shipwrecking Company on 30 September 1947, for scrapping.

References

Bibliography

External links 

 
 hazegray.org: USS Brownsville

Tacoma-class frigates
World War II patrol vessels of the United States
Ships built in Richmond, California
1943 ships
Ships transferred from the United States Navy to the United States Coast Guard